Daughters of the Dust is a 1991 independent film written, directed and produced by Julie Dash and is the first feature film directed by an African-American woman distributed theatrically in the United States. Set in 1902, it tells the story of three generations of Gullah (also known as Geechee) women in the Peazant family on Saint Helena Island as they prepare to migrate off the island, out of the Southern United States, and into the North.

The film gained critical praise for its lush visuals, Gullah dialogue and non-linear storytelling. The cast features Cora Lee Day, Alva Rogers, Barbara-O, Trula Hoosier, Vertamae Grosvenor, and Kaycee Moore and was filmed on St. Helena Island in South Carolina. Daughters of the Dust was selected for the Sundance 1991 dramatic competition. Director of photography Arthur Jafa won the top cinematography prize. The film is also known for being the first by an African American woman to gain a general theatrical release.

Dash has written two books about Daughters of the Dust, one about making the film, co-authored with Toni Cade Bambara and bell hooks, and one novel, a sequel set 20 years after the film's story. In 2004, the film was selected for preservation in the United States National Film Registry by the Library of Congress as being "culturally, historically, or aesthetically significant." For its 25th anniversary, Daughters of the Dust was restored and re-released in 2016 by the Cohen Media Group.

Plot 
Daughters of the Dust is set in 1902 among the members of the Peazant family, Gullah islanders who live at Ibo Landing on Dataw Island (St. Simons Island), off the Georgia coast. Their ancestors were brought there as enslaved people centuries ago, and the islanders developed a language—known as Gullah or Sea Island Creole English—and culture that was creolized from West Africans of Ibo, Yoruba, Mende, and Twi origin, along with some influence from the Bakongo of central Africa as well as the cultures and languages of the British Isles, with the common variety of English being the superstratum in this case Developed in their relative isolation of large plantations on the islands, the enslaved peoples' unique culture and language have endured over time. Their dialogue is in Gullah creole.

Narrated by the Unborn Child, the future daughter of Eli and Eula, whose voice is influenced by accounts of her ancestors, the film presents poetic visual images and circular narrative structures to represent the past, present and future for the Gullah, the majority of whom are about to embark for the mainland and a more modern, "civilized" way of life. The old ways and African ancestral history are represented by community matriarch Nana Peazant, who practices African spiritual rituals. Nana tells her family as she bids them to remember and honour their ancestors as they embark on their new journey, "We are two people in one body. The last of the old and the first of the new."

Contrasting cousins, Viola, a devout Christian, and Yellow Mary, a free spirit who has brought her lover, Trula, from the city, arrive at the island by boat from their homes on the mainland for a last dinner with their family. Yellow Mary plans to leave for Nova Scotia after her visit. Mr. Snead, a mainland photographer, accompanies Viola and takes portraits of the islanders before they leave their way of life forever. Intertwined with these narratives is the marital rift between Eli and his wife Eula, who is about to give birth after being raped by a white man on the mainland. Eli struggles with the fact that the unborn child may not be his and his mother's pressure for him to maintain his connection to his ancestors. The unborn child of Eli and Eula narrates the film tracing the legacy before her birth.

Several other family members' stories unfold between these narratives. They include Haagar, a cousin who finds the old spiritual beliefs and provincialism of the island "backwards," and is impatient to leave for a more modern society with its educational and economic opportunities. Her daughter Iona longs to be with her secret lover St. Julien Lastchild, a Cherokee Native American, a resident of the island. Lastchild presents Iona with a letter confessing his devotion the day of Iona's departure asking her to stay with him.

While the women prepare a traditional meal for the feast, which includes okra, yams and shellfish prepared at the beach, the men gather nearby in groups to talk and play games. The children and teenagers play games, practice religious rites on the beach, and have a Bible-study session with Viola. Yellow Mary and Eula bond as survivors of rape. Bilal Muhammad, a cousin that is believed to be Ibo but hails from the French West Indies, leads a Muslim prayer. Nana evokes the spirits of the family's ancestors who worked on the island's indigo plantations. Nana combines the power of their ancestors with Viola's Bible as a symbol of the old and the new. Eula and Eli reveal the history and folklore of the slave uprising and mass suicide at Ibo Landing. The Peazant family members make their final decisions to leave the island for a new beginning, or stay behind and maintain their way of life. Yellow Mary chooses to stay on the island along with Eli and Eula. In tears, Iona jumps off the boat prior to departing as Lastchild comes for her on horseback. Haagar is held back by another family member while calling for her daughter. Remaining family members watch as most of the Peazants finally depart.

Cast

Production

Development 
Originally conceived in 1975, Dash planned to make a short film with no dialogue as a visual account of a Gullah family's preparation to leave their Sea Island home to a new life in the North. She was inspired by her father's Gullah family, who migrated to New York City in the early 20th century during the Great Migration of African Americans from the southern states. Her narrative forms were also inspired by the writing of Toni Morrison, Alice Walker and Melville Herskovits. As the story developed for more than 10 years, Dash clarified her artistic vision and together with Arthur Jafa, her cinematographer and co-producer, she put together a short film to use for marketing.

She initially was rejected by Hollywood executives, as this was to be her first full-length film. Dash said they thought it was "too different" as she thought their reaction was part of a systematic exclusion of black women from Hollywood. Persisting, Dash finally got $800,000 financing from the PBS series American Playhouse in 1988.

Casting 
With funding secured, Dash and Casting Director Len Hunt, cast a number of veterans of black independent cinema in various roles, as a tribute to the work they had done and the sacrifices they had made to work in independent films. She would hire a mix of union and non-union members for her crew, with the latter being cast for their familiarity with the Gullah language, which the main actors would have to learn. Rogers had one previous film credit with School Daze and was known for her work as a playwright and vocalist, while Jones had worked previously with Dash in the short Diary of an African Nun (1977) and Grosvenor was a culinary anthropologist with a Gullah background.

Dialogue and narrative structure 
For the sake of authenticity and poetry, the characters from the island speak in Gullah dialect. Ronald Daise, author of Reminiscences of Sea Island Heritage (1987), was the dialect coach for her actors, none of whom knew Gullah at the start of production.

The narrative structure is non-linear, of which Dash explained:

I didn't want to tell a historical drama about African-American women in the same way that I had seen other dramas. I decided to work with a different type of narrative structure...[and] that the typical male-oriented western-narrative structure was not appropriate for this particular film. So I let the story unravel and reveal itself in a way in which an African Gullah would tell the story, because that's part of our tradition. The story unfolds throughout this day-and-a-half in various vignettes. It unfolds and comes back. It's a different way of telling a story. It's totally different, new.

Principal photography 
Director of photography Arthur Jafa began shooting on location at St. Helena Island and Hunting Island, off the South Carolina coast. Principal photography lasted 28 days, with a majority of the time spent shooting at exterior locations, such as the beach, in front of rustic homes, or further inland, where Nana's home is located near the island's graveyard. The sets, including cabins, the graveyard, and a figurative-sculpture dock at Igbo Landing, were constructed mostly using materials the Gullah would have had available at the time of the story. The costumes feature the women in long indigo-dyed and bright white dresses. The majority of closeups in the film are on the women, and the majority of dialogue is spoken by women and girls. American artist Kerry James Marshall handled production design, brought on by Jafa despite never meeting before.

The key make-up artist and hair designer for Daughters of the Dust is Pamela Ferrell. During production, Ferrell worked very close with Julie Dash to help provide creative details needed for the vision and style of every scene in the movie. Ferrell also worked with the actors and actresses on set, where she detailed the make-up for each scene to help get the desired aesthetic.

During production on Hunting Island, the crew was evacuated to Charleston, South Carolina to avoid the incoming Hurricane Hugo. Hugo changed track and scored a direct hit on Charleston, causing a historic amount of damage.

Often, the cast would have to come to set on a last-minute notice because of the environmental factors that took place.

Post-production 
Editing began in January 1990, and it took nearly a year to complete the film. Dash chose not to use subtitles, preferring to have audiences be immersed in the language. The soundtrack was composed by John Barnes, featuring a blend of Synclavier percussion with traditional instruments, including the Middle Eastern santour, and African bata and talking drums.

Release 
Daughters of the Dust screened at the 1991 Sundance Film Festival where it was nominated for the Grand Jury Prize and won the Excellence in Cinematography Award. It was released by Kino International—the first feature film made by an African-American woman to be distributed theatrically in the United States.

Reception 
The film opened in January 1992 to mostly critical acclaim. The Boston Globe called it "Mesmerizing...a film rich with [black women's] faces, voices and movement."

The New York Times lauded the film's languid pace and "spellbinding visual beauty" while noting that its unconventional narrative structure made the characters in relation to the story at times difficult to follow. Critic Stephen Holden said the individual stories in the film formed a "broad weave in which the fabric of daily life, from food preparation to ritualized remembrance, is ultimately more significant than any of the psychological conflicts that surface." He hailed Dash as a "strikingly original film maker."

Roger Ebert called the film a tone-poem and highlighted the screenplay's Gullah dialect: "The fact that some of the dialogue is deliberately difficult is not frustrating, but comforting; we relax like children at a family picnic, not understanding everything, but feeling at home with the expression of it."

Upon its 2016 re-release, The Village Voice review commended the film's "stunning motifs and tableaux, the iconography seemingly sourced from dreams as much as from history and folklore." The Guardian critic Peter Bradshaw called the film "mysterious, fabular and sometimes dreamlike," comparing it to Chekhov or a performance of Shakespeare's Tempest.

The film holds a 94% approval rating on Rotten Tomatoes, based on 77 reviews, with a weighted average of 7.6/10. The site's consensus reads: "Daughters of the Dust addresses its weighty themes with lovely visuals and a light, poetic touch, offering an original, absorbing look at a largely unexplored corner of American culture".

Despite the positive reviews, the promise of an illustrious film career did not pan out for Dash. She concluded that industry executives were uncertain about the film's unconventional form, stating in 2007 that "Hollywood and mainstream television are still not quite open to what I have to offer."
Nonetheless, the film has continued to resonate with critics and audiences and Dash would go on to a productive television career.

The Library of Congress added Daughters of the Dust to the National Film Registry in 2004, noting its status as the first feature-length film by an African-American woman to receive wide theatrical release, calling it an "evocative, emotional look at family, era and place."

In 2022, Daughters of the Dust was named at number 60 in the Sight & Sound Greatest Films of All Time list selected by critics and published every 10 years since 1952.

Restoration and re-release 
For its 25th anniversary, the Cohen Media Group restored Daughters of the Dust for a screening at the 2016 Toronto Film Festival and a theatrical release. When Beyoncé's acclaimed visual album Lemonade aired on HBO and online in the spring of that year, critics noted that Lemonade made several visual references to Daughters of the Dust. Beyoncé's modern take featured young women, some in long white dresses, walking toward a beach or settled on the front porch of a rustic island cabin. The homage brought attention to the film in articles for Vanity Fair, Rolling Stone, NPR, and Essence. With new acclaim, Daughters of the Dust was re-released in theaters in November 2016, along with a new trailer and poster.

Awards and nominations 
 Sundance Film Festival – Excellence in Cinematography Award, nominated for Grand Jury Prize, 1991
 Selected for National Film Registry of the Library of Congress, 2004
 Cascade Festival of African Films, Portland, Oregon – Excellence in Cinematography Award, 2005
 New York Film Critics Circle Awards – Special Award, 2016

Related books 
Dash has written two books related to Daughters of the Dust:
 Co-authored with Toni Cade Bambara and bell hooks, Daughters of the Dust: The Making of an African American Woman's Film (1992). The book includes the screenplay.
 Daughters of the Dust: A Novel (1997), a sequel set 20 years after the passage explored in the film. Amelia, a young anthropology student who grew up in Harlem, goes to the Sea Islands to meet her mother's relatives and learn about their culture. The novel was selected in 2011 for the Charleston County Public Library's One Book Program.

See also 
 Gullah people
 Sea Island Creole English
 Igbo Landing

References

External links 
 Official Site
 
 
 
 
 
 Daughter of the Dust essay by Daniel Eagan in America's Film Legacy: The Authoritative Guide to the Landmark Movies in the National Film Registry, A&C Black, 2010 , pages 805-806 

1991 films
1991 drama films
1990s American films
1990s English-language films
1990s feminist films
1991 directorial debut films
1991 independent films
African-American drama films
American feminist films
American independent films
Films directed by Julie Dash
Films set in 1902
Films set in Georgia (U.S. state)
Films shot in South Carolina
Gullah in popular culture
History of women in South Carolina
Southern Gothic films
Sundance Film Festival award winners
United States National Film Registry films